The Joliet Regional Port District is a special-purpose district in Will County, Illinois.  The District includes all territory in DuPage, Lockport, Joliet, Troy, and Channahon townships and operates Lewis University Airport.

External links
 Joliet Regional Port District Act (70 ILCS 1825/1 et seq.)
 Official Site

Districts of Illinois
Romeoville, Illinois